Toxonevra superba is a species of flutter fly in the family Pallopteridae.

References

Further reading

External links

 
 

Pallopteridae
Insects described in 1861
Taxa named by Hermann Loew